Cheung Yi Nei (born 20 November 1973) is a fencer from Hong Kong, who won a bronze medal at the 2006 Asian Games in the women's épée team competition.

References

Living people
1973 births
Hong Kong female épée fencers
Place of birth missing (living people)
Asian Games medalists in fencing
Fencers at the 2002 Asian Games
Fencers at the 2006 Asian Games
Asian Games bronze medalists for Hong Kong
Medalists at the 2006 Asian Games
Medalists at the 2002 Asian Games
21st-century Hong Kong women